Chirbas Parbat (Hindi:चीड़वास पर्वत) is a mountain of the Garhwal Himalaya in Uttarakhand, India. It is joint 81st highest located entirely within the Uttrakhand. Nanda Devi, is the highest mountain in this category. Chirbas Parbat lies between the Kalidhang  and Matri . Its nearest higher neighbor Matri lies 3 km SE. It is located 5.9 km NW of Chaturbhuj  and 13.8 km east lies Trimukhi Parbat .

climbing history
The first ascent of Chirbas Parbat happened on 8 June 1986 by Kangchenjunga Foundation, Calcutta. The team led by Indranath Mukherjee who was one of the member of 1985 team led by R Bhattacharya. Goutam Dutta and Sher Singh reached the summit of Chirbas Parbat on 8 June.

Glaciers and rivers

Chirbas Bamak on the northern side. Gulli gad bamak on the eastern side from there emerges gulligad nall which later joins Jadh Ganga near Neylong. That further joins Bhagirathi river near Bharion ghati. one of the main tributaries of the river Ganga. On the south west side lies Deogad Bamak which drains itself between chirbas and Gangotri.

Neighboring peaks

Neighboring peaks of Chirbas Parbat:

 Chaturbhuj  
 Matri 
 Sudarshan Parbat 
 Kalidhang 
 Yogeshwar:

See also

 List of Himalayan peaks of Uttarakhand

References

Mountains of Uttarakhand
Six-thousanders of the Himalayas
Geography of Chamoli district